Peculator porphyria is a species of sea snail, a marine gastropod mollusc in the family Volutomitridae, the mitres.

References

 Bouchet P. & Kantor Y. 2004. New Caledonia: the major centre of biodiversity for volutomitrid molluscs (Mollusca: Neogastropoda: Volutomitridae). Systematics and Biodiversity 1(4): 467-502.

Further reading 
 

Volutomitridae
Gastropods of Australia
Gastropods of New Zealand
Gastropods described in 1896